Alison Helen Lucy Cork  (born 28 July 1963) is an English interiors expert, entrepreneur, author, and TV presenter. She is the founder and CEO of online brand alisonathome.com and founder of Make It Your Business.

Publishing

In 1992, Cork co-founded mail order publishing company Carnell Ltd with entrepreneur publisher John P Gommes. The company was subsequently floated on the London Stock Exchange in 1994. It published titles such as How To Talk To Your Cat and Vinegar, Honey and Lemon, Nature's Medicine Chest. The Government Auction Handbook sold 200,000 copies in the space of a few months. Alison's 1994 book Profit Through The Post, was voted Book of the Month by Mensa. From 1995 onwards, Cork wrote five books including The Streetwise Guide To Renovating Your Home and Special Occasions. Published in 2000, it included various recipes and creative ideas.

Broadcasting

In 1996, ITV commissioned Cork's first network show, Home In The Country. From 1997 onwards, Cork has presented a number of TV series, including Countdown To Christmas and Domestic Magic (both for Channel Five). In 2005, Cork presented a 30-part series for ITV called Don't Move, Improve, which saw her travelling the country with fellow presenter Michael Holmes. From 1997 onwards Cork has presented various home interest shows including Homes & Property, 60 Minute Makeover and Help I Hate MY House!. In 2012 she presented Secret Removers for Channel 4 and in 2015, Alison presented Cowboy Builders.

Since 2014, Alison has become a regular presence on Home Shopping Channel QVC featuring her interiors collections. 

In 2020 she launched on HSN in the United States.

Journalism
Cork has also written weekly interiors column for the London Evening Standard since 2002. Since 2005, she has also written a weekly column for The Daily Telegraph called Bargain Hunters, showing readers where to find the best deals and negotiating discounts on their behalf. Cork writes homes and interiors columns and features for several national papers, including The Times, The Guardian, The Observer, and I.

Online
In 2011 Cork launched two furniture collections for Made.com. In September 2012, Cork launched an online furniture and accessories business, Alison at Home.
In 2017, Alison launched several bathroom collections for online bathroom retailer Victorian Plumbing.

Charity
From 2013 to 2015, Cork was an ambassador for PRIME (The Prince's Initiative for Mature Enterprise).

In 2017, Cork founded The National Women's Enterprise Network, which incorporates Make It Your Business, a not-for-profit initiative to encourage women to set up their own business

In 2020, Cork became an Ambassador for the British Library Business & IP Centre network with the aim of helping them to establish a Business and IP Centre in every library in the UK by 2030, to support SMEs and to stimulate enterprise, particularly in the post Covid economy.

Politics
In 2018, Cork was appointed Conservative Champion for Women Entrepreneurs. She was longlisted but not shortlisted to be the Conservative in the 2020 London mayoral election.

Honours

In 2021 Cork received the Freedom of the City of London. 

Cork was appointed Member of the Order of the British Empire (MBE) in the 2023 New Year Honours for services to female entrepreneurship.

Personal life
Cork met her husband Efi Zazo in 1996 after dialing the wrong phone number. They now reside in London's Belgravia with their two sons. The purchase of Cork's home was featured in the Telegraph under the headline "Belgravia or Bust", detailing her journey to find out and overhaul her dream home.

Television credits

Bibliography

References 

English columnists
British technology company founders
British television presenters
Living people
1963 births
Conservative Party (UK) politicians
Members of the Order of the British Empire